An aquiline nose (also called a Roman nose) is a human nose with a prominent bridge, giving it the appearance of being curved or slightly bent. The word aquiline comes from the Latin word aquilinus ("eagle-like"), an allusion to the curved beak of an eagle.

In racialist discourse

In racialist discourse, especially that of post-Enlightenment Western scientists and writers, a Roman nose has frequently been characterized as a marker of beauty and nobility, as in Plutarch's description of Mark Antony. The supposed science of physiognomy, popular during the Victorian era, made the "prominent" nose a marker of Aryanness: "the shape of the nose and the cheeks indicated, like the forehead's angle, the subject's social status and level of intelligence. A Roman nose was superior to a snub nose in its suggestion of firmness and power, and heavy jaws revealed a latent sensuality and coarseness".

Among Native Americans

The aquiline nose was deemed a distinctive feature of some Native American tribes, members of which often took their names after their own characteristic physical attributes (such as the Roman nose). In the depiction of Native Americans, for instance, an aquiline nose is one of the standard traits of the "noble warrior" type. It is so important as a cultural marker, as Renee Ann Cramer argued in Cash, Color, and Colonialism (2005), that tribes without such characteristics have found it difficult to receive the "federal recognition" or "acknowledgement" from the US government that is necessary to have a continuous government-to-government relationship with the United States.

Among South Asian peoples 
Among South Asian ethnic groups, the aquiline nose type is most common among the peoples of Afghanistan, Dardistan, Pakistan and Kashmir, as well as a prominent feature in the Greco-Buddhist statuary of Gandhara (a region spanning the upper Indus and Kabul River valleys throughout northern Pakistan and Kashmir). The ethnographer George Campbell, in his Ethnology of India, stated:The high nose, slightly aquiline, is a common type [among Kashmiri Brahmins]. Raise a little the brow of a Greek statue and give the nose a small turn at the bony point in front of the bridge, so as to break the straightness of the line, you have the model type of this part of India, to be found both in living men and in the statues of the Peshawar Valley.

See also
 Anatomy of the human nose
 Jewish nose

References

Further reading 
 

Biological anthropology
Facial features
Nose